Giovanni Colonna (ca. 1170 – 28 January 1245) was a cardinal of the Catholic Church from the Roman noble family of Colonna. He is occasionally named "the Younger" to distinguish him from his near-contemporary cardinal Giovanni di San Paolo, who is frequently considered as related to the Colonna family. As papal legate, he accompanied the Latin Emperor Peter II of Courtenay to Greece, where he was taken captive by Theodore Komnenos Doukas. Released from captivity, Colonna served in 1220–21 as regent of the Latin Empire before returning to Italy in 1223. Colonna participated in the conclaves of 1216 (election of Pope Honorius III), 1227 (Pope Gregory IX), and 1243 (Pope Innocent IV). He was one of the leaders of the papal army in the War of the Keys (1228–1229) and a negotiator of the Treaty of San Germano (1230).

1170s births
1245 deaths
13th-century Italian cardinals
Giovanni
Regents of the Latin Empire
Cardinals created by Pope Innocent III
Prisoners and detainees of the Despotate of Epirus